Operation Hirondelle took place during the First Indochina War in July 1953. It was an airborne raid on Viet Minh supply depots near Lạng Sơn, involving parachute units of the French Army and Vietnamese National Army. Raids near the junction of Route Coloniale 4 and Route Coloniale 1 revealed supply caches hidden in caves, which were photographed and destroyed.

The attack forces then retreated over land through Loc Binh, where other French units had been dropped on July 17 to repair and hold a river crossing for the retreating units; and then to form a rearguard for 20 miles. The entire force rendezvoused with Groupe Mobile Five, and was then extracted by sea on July 19, suffering from heat exhaustion. The average weight loss was 11 pounds.

Notes

References
Online

 

Printed

 
 
 
 
 

Battles involving Vietnam
Military operations involving France
Battles and operations of the First Indochina War
Conflicts in 1953
1953 in French Indochina
Vietnamese independence movement
1953 in Vietnam
July 1953 events in Asia
History of Lạng Sơn Province